Helcystogramma fuscomarginatum is a moth in the family Gelechiidae. It was described by Ueda in 1995. It is known from Japan, Korea and Guangdong, China.

The larvae feed on Oplismenus undulatifolius.

References

Moths described in 1995
fuscomarginatum
Moths of Asia